Calhoun County is a rural county in the southwestern part of the U.S. state of Georgia. Its county seat is Morgan.

History 
Calhoun County was named for John C. Calhoun, the seventh Vice President of the United States. It was created from parts of Early and Baker counties on February 20, 1854.

Rival political factions disagreed about whether the county seat should be in Concord, a community north of present-day Leary, or in Dickey, then known as Whitney. As a compromise, a spot halfway between Concord and Whitney was chosen for the county seat, and the town of Morgan was established there.

In 1923 the state legislature moved the county seat to Arlington as directed by a county referendum. This decision was reversed in 1929, restoring Morgan as the county seat.

Calhoun Memorial Hospital, a 25-bed critical access hospital in Arlington originally founded as a Hill-Burton hospital, closed in 2013 after 62 years of operation.      

In 2008, members of the Downtown Business Authority in Arlington founded the South Georgia Regional Information Technology Authority (SGRITA) with help from the state government to provide wireless broadband service to several counties in rural southwest Georgia. In 2017 SGRITA moved its office to Blakely in Early County.

Geography 
The county seat is Morgan, where the historic Calhoun County Courthouse is located.

The vast majority of Calhoun County is in the Ichawaynochaway Creek sub-basin of the ACF River Basin (Apalachicola-Chattahoochee-Flint River Basin). The county's western and southwestern corner, from Arlington running northwest to west of Edison, is in the Spring Creek sub-basin of the same larger ACF River Basin.

The United States Department of Agriculture has designated most of the county's land as prime farmland. Agricultural, forestry, and wildlife plantations line the county's eastern edge.

Adjacent counties 
 Terrell County (northeast)
 Dougherty County (east)
 Baker County (southeast)
 Early County (southwest)
 Clay County (west)
 Randolph County (northwest)

Demographics

2020 census

As of the 2020 United States census, there were 5,573 people, 1,736 households, and 1,152 families residing in the county. Of these people, 4.0% were under 5 years old, 16.9% were under 18, and 16.6% were 65 or over. The population was 39.3% female. The foreign-born population was 4.1% of the total. Of residents aged 5 or older, 7.7% spoke a language other than English at home.  

There were 1,736 households. The average household size was 2.56. The county had 2,406 housing units, of which 65.6% were owner-occupied.

2010 census
As of the 2010 United States Census, there were 6,694 people, 2,002 households, and 1,292 families living in the county. The racial makeup of the county was 61.3% black or African American, 34.7% white, 0.4% Asian, 0.3% Pacific islander, 0.1% American Indian, 2.1% from other races, and 1.0% from two or more races. Those of Hispanic or Latino origin made up 3.9% of the population. In terms of ancestry, 7.3% were American, and 6.3% were Irish.

Of the 2,002 households, 32.7% had children under the age of 18 living with them, 38.2% were married couples living together, 22.6% had a female householder with no husband present, 35.5% were non-families, and 32.5% of all households were made up of individuals. The average household size was 2.49 and the average family size was 3.20. The median age was 38.7 years.

The median income for a household in the county was $30,522 and the median income for a family was $37,309. Males had a median income of $27,096 versus $20,845 for females. The per capita income for the county was $12,452. About 20.3% of families and 28.8% of the population were below the poverty line, including 42.0% of those under age 18 and 14.6% of those age 65 or over.

Economy
Many farms in Calhoun County grow corn, oats, sorghum, and wheat. Still Pond Vineyard Winery & Distillery produces moonshine, vodka, brandy, whisky, and 19 varieties of muscadine wine.

Calhoun State Prison in Morgan is a major employer. Calhoun Nursing Home, a 60-bed long-term care facility in Edison, is now operated by Miller County. Willowood Personal Care Home is an assisted-living facility, also in Edison.

Government

Calhoun County has a council-manager government with five commissioners elected by district.

Education
The Calhoun County School District has an elementary school and a middle-high school all in Edison. The district has about 530 students.

Pataula Charter Academy opened in 2010 in Edison as a tuition-free public charter school serving several counties in southwest Georgia. It has about 609 students in kindergarten through 12th grade. 

The Calhoun County Library in Edison is part of the Kinchafoonee Regional Library System.

Recreation
The Chickasawahatchee Wildlife Management Area covers 19,700 acres, including parts of Calhoun, Dougherty, and Baker Counties. It has campsites, hiking trails, a shooting range, and an archery range. It also offers hunting, fishing, canoeing, and bird watching. 

Calhoun County and its cities normally hold several annual festivals. Usually in May Arlington hosts a May Day festival and Edison hosts the Billie Lane King Cotton Charity Horse Show. In November the Southwest Georgia High Cotton 65-mile Yard Sale generally occurs along State Route 37. And the Leary Christmas Parade normally happens in December.

Communities

Cities
 Arlington
 Edison
 Leary
 Morgan

Unincorporated communities
 Dickey
 Williamsburg
 Moye

Transportation

Major highways 
  State Route 37
  State Route 41
  State Route 45
  State Route 55
  State Route 62
  State Route 216
  State Route 234

Politics
Calhoun County is staunchly Democratic in US presidential elections. The last Republican candidate to win the county was Richard Nixon in 1972.

See also

 National Register of Historic Places listings in Calhoun County, Georgia

References

External links
 Calhoun County historical marker

 
1854 establishments in Georgia (U.S. state)
Georgia (U.S. state) counties
Populated places established in 1854
Black Belt (U.S. region)
Majority-minority counties in Georgia